John Long may refer to:

Politicians
John Long (MP for Cricklade) (c. 1419–1478), English Member of Parliament for Cricklade
John Long (16th-century MP) (c. 1517 – c. 1600/1602), MP for Knaresborough, Hedon, Shaftesbury and Newcastle-under-Lyme
John Long (Irish politician), member of the Parliament of Ireland in 1689 for Midleton, County Cork
John Long (North Carolina politician) (1785–1857), U.S. Representative from North Carolina
John Davis Long (1838–1915), Governor of Massachusetts, later the U.S. Secretary of the Navy
John B. Long (1843–1924), U.S. Representative from Texas
 John A. Long, Australian paleontologist
John Andrew Long (1869–1941), Senator in Northern Ireland
John David Long (1901–1967), South Carolina state senator
John H. Long (political candidate) (fl. late 20th – early 21st centuries), Canadian political figure
J. H. Long (John Henry Long, 1845–1898), American politician in Washington State

Religion
John Longe (1548–1589), English Protestant archbishop of Armagh
John Longe (priest), priest and county magistrate
John Long (evangelist) (1872–1962), Pentecostal preacher
John Long (priest) (1913–2008), Anglican Archdeacon of Ely

Sports
John Long (climber) (born 1953), American rock climber and writer
John Long (basketball player) (born 1956), American basketball player
Johnny Long (American football) (1914–1975), American football quarterback
John Long (basketball coach), college men's basketball coach
John Long (Australian footballer) (born 1946), Australian rules footballer
John Long (Gaelic footballer) (born 1952), Irish Gaelic footballer

Others
John Long (artist) (1964–2016), artist and painter from Northern Ireland
John Long (computer scientist) (born 1935), British computer scientist
John Long (blues musician) (born 1950), American country blues singer, fingerstyle guitarist, harmonica player and songwriter
John Dixon Long (1817–1894), American abolitionist
John Luther Long (1861–1927), American lawyer and writer whose short story Madame Butterfly inspired the opera by Puccini
Johnny Long (musician) (1914–1972), American violinist and big band leader
John A. Long (born 1957), Australian paleontologist and author of children's books and popular science and adventure books
Johnny Long, American computer security researcher and author
John Varah Long (1826–1869), clerk for Brigham Young, the second president of The Church of Jesus Christ of Latter-day Saints
John H. Long (chemist) (1856–1918), president of the American Chemical Society
John Herbert Long (1904–1985), English music teacher and organist
John Long Ltd, publisher